The Copa de Competencia was an official Argentine football cup competition contested between 1920 and 1926. It was established by the "Asociación Amateurs de Football", a dissident body formed a year before. The Associación Amateurs organized its own championships until 1926 when it merged to official Asociación Argentina.

Unlike the Copa de Competencia Jockey Club, this Cup did not qualify any team to play an international match because it had been created by a dissident league (clubs registered to AFA played against the Uruguayan Football Association champions).

The inaugural edition of the cup was contested by 21 clubs from dissident leagues of Buenos aires and Rosario. From 1924 to its end, the tournament was played by teams from Buenos Aires only due to the Rosario representatives had joined Liga Rosarina de Football.

List of champions

Finals
The following list includes all the editions of the Copa de Competencia:

Notes

Titles by club

Topscorers 
Source:

See also
 Copa Presidente de la Nación
 Asociación Amateurs de Football

References

Defunct football competitions in Argentina
Recurring sporting events established in 1920
1926 disestablishments in Argentina
1920 establishments in Argentina
Recurring sporting events disestablished in 1926